Fahad Saket (Arabic:فهد ساكت) (born 15 March 1991) is a Qatari footballer who plays as a forward.

References

External links
 

Qatari footballers
1991 births
Living people
Al-Shahania SC players
Al-Shamal SC players
Al-Khor SC players
Al Sadd SC players
Al Kharaitiyat SC players
Al Bidda SC players
Qatar Stars League players
Qatari Second Division players
Association football forwards